Baby I'm Yours is Maureen McGovern's eighth studio album (and first in three years), released in 1992.

This is a cover album of 15 songs from the years 1955 to 1970. Inside the album cover are notes that McGovern made about her youth in Youngstown, Ohio and specific notes on all of the selected songs on the album and how they are meaningful to her. The seventh track is a medley of two songs by the Beatles. Other songs include three songs by Burt Bacharach and Hal David (two of which were made popular by Dionne Warwick, one of her influences) and the Duprees' hit "You Belong to Me." The front of the album cover shows McGovern with her hair dyed red and her wearing a green diamond-covered outfit.

Track listing

Album credits
Produced by: Ron Barron

Keyboards
Jeff Harris for "Are You There (With Another Girl)," "I Will," "Baby I'm Yours," "Angel on My Shoulder," "Things We Said Today/For No One," "Blue on Blue," "Anyone Who Had a Heart," and "You Can Close Your Eyes"
Mike Renzi for "It's All in the Game," "Sincerely," "You Belong to Me," "Gonna Get Along Without You Now," "Put Your Head on My Shoulder," "You Don't Have to Say You Love Me": Mike Renzi

Electric bass
Anthony Jackson for all songs except "Things We Said Today/For No One" and "Blue on Blue"
Mark Egan for "Things We Said Today/For No One" and "Blue on Blue"
Acoustic and electric guitars: Jeff Mironov
Drums and percussion: Allan Schwartzberg
Alto sax, tenor sax, soprano sax, flute: Lou Marini
Synth programmer and overdubs: Jamie Lawrence
Electric violin on "Gonna Get Along Without You Now": Mark Feldman
Harmonica on "Put Your Head on My Shoulder": William Galison
The Clinton Chorus on "You Can Close Your Eyes": Cheryl Alexander, Megan Barron, Rob Fisher, Troy Halderson, Jeff Harris, Maureen McGovern, Susan H. Schulman
Vocals and background harmonies: Maureen McGovern
Background vocal harmonies "Blue on Blue" arranged by: Jeff Harris
Chief recording engineer: Ed Rak
Principal assistant engineer: Troy Halderson
Assistant engineer: Jackie Brown
Synthesizer programming: Jamie Lawrence
Synthesizer recording engineer: Danny Lawrence
Assistant engineers: Derrick Garrett, Joe Martin
Album mixed by: Ed Rak and Ron Barron
Music copying and contracting: Frank Zuback
Recorded August–October 1991, Clinton Recording Studios
Mastered at Sterling Sound by Ted Jensen

References

1992 albums
Maureen McGovern albums
Covers albums
RCA Records albums